Víctor Germán Correa Díaz (born 26 December 1939) is a Chilean politician and sociologist who served as minister during the christian-democratic presidencies of Patricio Aylwin and Eduardo Frei Ruíz-Tagle.

References

External links
 Profile at Annales de la República

1939 births
Chilean people
Chilean sociologists
University of Chile alumni
University of California, Berkeley alumni
20th-century Chilean politicians
21st-century Chilean politicians
Socialist Party of Chile politicians
Living people